The following is a partial list of selected massacres that are known to have occurred in the territory of modern-day Belarus (some numbers may be approximated):

References

Belarus
Massacres

Massacres